Fejervarya is a genera of frogs in the family Dicroglossidae found in Asia. First proposed in 1915 by István József Bolkay, a Hungarian naturalist, the genus did not see widespread adoption at first. As late as the 1990s it was generally included in Rana, but more recent studies have confirmed its distinctness.

These frogs are remarkable for being extremely euryhaline by amphibian standards. Species such as the crab-eating frog (F. cancrivora) can thrive in brackish water, and its tadpoles can even survive in pure seawater.

Systematics and taxonomy

Fejervarya was first introduced as subgenus of Rana and later placed as subgenus as Limnonectes. It was treated as an independent genus first in 1998. However, Fejervarya sensu lato was found to be paraphyletic with respect to Sphaerotheca. This issue was eventually resolved in 2011 by splitting some species to the genus Zakerana (renamed in 2021 as Minervarya). Fejervarya, as now defined, is distributed from eastern India (Orissa) eastwards through Myanmar to southern China and Indochina to the islands of the Sunda Shelf as well as Japan. In contrast, Minervarya contains species from southern Asia (Sri Lanka and Indian subcontinent including Pakistan, Nepal, and Bangladesh).

The widespread Cricket Frog (F. limnocharis) and some others have also been suspected to be cryptic species complexes since at least the 1970s, and indeed a few populations have been identified that almost certainly constitute undescribed species.

Species
The following 14 species are recognised in the genus Fejerverya:

 Fejervarya cancrivora (Gravenhorst, 1829)
 Fejervarya iskandari Veith, Kosuch, Ohler, and Dubois, 2001
 Fejervarya jhilmilensis Bahuguna, 2018
 Fejervarya kawamurai Djong, Matsui, Kuramoto, Nishioka, and Sumida, 2011
 Fejervarya kupitzi Köhler et al., 2019
 Fejervarya limnocharis (Gravenhorst, 1829)
 Fejervarya moodiei (Taylor, 1920)
 Fejervarya multistriata (Hallowell, 1861)
 Fejervarya orissaensis (Dutta, 1997)
 Fejervarya pulla (Stoliczka, 1870)
 Fejervarya sakishimensis Matsui, Toda, and Ota, 2008
 Fejervarya triora Stuart, Chuaynkern, Chan-ard, and Inger, 2006
 Fejervarya verruculosa (Roux, 1911)
 Fejervarya vittigera (Wiegmann, 1834)

Phylogeny
The following phylogeny of Fejervarya is from Pyron & Wiens (2011). 7 species are included. Fejervarya is a sister group of Minervarya, which had until recently been included in Fejervarya.

Vocalisation behaviour

References

External links

 
Dicroglossidae
Amphibians of Asia
Amphibian genera